Grafengehaig is a municipality in the district of Kulmbach in Bavaria in Germany.

It is a part of the Franconian Forest nature park.

City arrangement

Grafengehaig is arranged in the following boroughs:

References

Kulmbach (district)